von Beckerath is a surname. Many people carrying the name are members of the noble German Mennonite Beckerath family.

 Hermann von Beckerath (1801–1870), banker and Prussian statesman
 Jürgen von Beckerath (1920–2016), German Egyptologist
 Moritz von Beckerath (1838–1896), painter ofrom the Düsseldorf school of painting
 Rudolf von Beckerath (1907–1976), master organ builder (son of Willy)
 Rudolf von Beckerath Orgelbau
 Willy von Beckerath (1868–1938), painter and art professor (father of Rudolf)